The Muskogee Redskins were a Class-D minor league baseball team based in Muskogee, Oklahoma that played in the Oklahoma–Arkansas–Kansas League (1907), Oklahoma–Kansas League (1908) and Western Association (1911).

Lon Ury managed the team each year it was in existence under the Redskins name.

References

Muskogee, Oklahoma
Baseball teams established in 1907
Defunct minor league baseball teams
Defunct baseball teams in Oklahoma
Defunct Western Association teams
Baseball teams disestablished in 1911
1907 establishments in Oklahoma
1911 disestablishments in Oklahoma